Milo Rau (born January 25, 1977) is a Swiss theater director, journalist, essayist and lecturer. He won the Swiss Theater Award in 2014.

Life
Milo Rau was born in Bern, Switzerland. He studied sociology, German studies, and Romance studies in Paris, Zürich, and Berlin, working under the instruction of Tzvetan Todorov and Pierre Bourdieu, amongst others. In 1997, he traveled as a journalist to Chiapas and Cuba, and in 2000 began writing for the Neue Zürcher Zeitung. Since 2002, he's been active as a playwright, author, and director in Switzerland and abroad, working with the Maxim Gorki Theater and Hebbel am Ufer in Berlin, Staatsschauspiel Dresden, the Théâtre Nanterre-Amandiers in Paris, and many other theaters. His work has earned him invitations to some of the world's largest theater and arts festivals, including the 2012-2013 Berliner Theatertreffen, the Festival d'Avignon, the Venice Biennale, and the Vienna Festival. In 2019, his piece La Reprise. Histoire(s) du théâtre (I), which documents the murder of Ihsane Jarfi, was performed at the Edinburgh International Festival.

In 2007, he founded a theater and film production company, the International Institute of Political Murder (IIPM), which he's been running since. The company was originally founded to coordinate Rau's project The Last Hour of Elena and Nicolae Ceaușescu, but over time, its focus broadened to its current goal of "the multimedia treatment of historical and sociopolitical conflicts." Since its founding, the IIPM has realized more than 50 theatrical productions, films, books, exhibitions, and political actions.

Alongside his work as a playwright and director, Rau has taught directing, cultural theory, and social sculpture at various universities and conservatories. Since 2017, he has also been a regular guest on the Swiss talk show , and in 2018 he became the artistic director of the Belgian NTGent, succeeding the Dutch director Johan Simons. With the company, Rau intends to establish a "global popular theater," specializing in international tours.

Work 
Amongst other projects, Rau has written and directed plays portraying the conviction and execution of Elena and Nicolae Ceaușescu (The Last Hour of Elena and Nicolae Ceausescu), Romanian Communist leaders; documenting a Rwandan radio station and its role in the Rwandan genocide (Hate Radio); and presenting Anders Breivik's address to the Oslo district court (Breivik's Statement). He's also engaged in more overtly political actions, from introducing a self-declared interim government in St. Gallen, Switzerland and calling for foreigners' right to vote (City of Change) to staging show trials in Zürich (the Zurich Trials) and Moscow (the Moscow Trials). In 2015, he convened an assembly of 60 victims, perpetrators, witnesses and analysts of the Second Congo War, the Congo Tribunal. The Guardian called it perhaps "the most ambitious political theatre ever staged"; Die Zeit wrote: "an insane project. Where politics fails, only art can help." In 2016, Rau's controversial play Five Easy Pieces, in which child actors play out the crimes of the child molester and serial murderer Marc Dutroux, became the first foreign production awarded the Special Prize of the Jury of Belgian Theater Critics. In 2017, the play was invited to the Berliner Theatertreffen.

Rau has been called "one of the most important and influential personalities in the European theater." He's been awarded the Schweizer Theaterpreis, the Hörspielpreis der Kriegsblinden, and the jury prize of the festival Politik im Freien Theater, amongst others, and was the youngest-ever winner of the Preis des . In 2015, the Tages-Anzeiger wrote: "Milo Rau, whose documentary-theatrical explosions regularly fill houses, has managed to cast his art far out of the ivory tower." At the same time, his controversial work is often accompanied by trials and public debate, bringing Rau the reputation of a "Scandal-Director." Breivik's Statement, for example, was banned from performance in the Nationaltheater Weimar and in Munich's Haus der Kunst, and during the production of The Last Hours of the Ceausescus, the dictator's adopted son sued Rau, claiming a trademark on the family name. Russian authorities raided his Moscow Trials, and performances of Five Easy Pieces were censored or cancelled in Singapore and various German cities.

In 2018, Rau opened his first season at the NTGent with the play Lam Gods, based on the Ghent Altarpiece and developed with his ensemble on the basis of their "Ghent Manifesto."

Europe Theatre Prize 
In 2018, he was awarded the XV Europe Prize Theatrical Realities, in Saint Petersburg, with the following motivation:A time when the complexity of the world and the events that characterise the whole planet is being neutralised by a torrent of too-speedy and superficial information, often in the service of economic and political interests, history can become volatile and confused with news items. In this context, Milo Rau’s theatre appears as ‘necessary theatre’: by putting its emphasis on events (political, social or other news items) and expanding them, it is forcing us to reflect and understand the realities of today’s life, and where our politics, humanity’s ancestral violence, our society and our lives are heading. Rau’s work, enriched by his remarkable literary, sociological, journalistic, cinematic and visual experience, is something that can give us hope that a vision that is critical, humanistic, cosmopolitan and throws light on the world can still be conceivable today.

Selected works 

2018 La Reprise. Histoire(s) du théâtre (I) (Theater)
2017 The 120 Days of Sodom, Zürich (Theater)
2016 Empire, Berlin (Theater, Book)
2016 Five Easy Pieces, Ghent (Theater)
2016 Compassion: The History of a Machine Gun, Berlin (Theater, Radio Play)
2015 The Dark Ages, Munich (Theater, Book)
2015 The Congo Tribunal, Berlin/Bukavu (Performance, Film, Book)
2014 The Civil Wars, Brussels/Zürich (Theater, Book)
2013/14 The Berlin Dialogues,  Berlin (Talkshow)
2013 The revelation of the real, Berlin (Installation, Book)
2013 The Zurich Trials, Zürich (Theater, Film, Book)
2013 The Moscow Trials, Moscow (Theater, Film, Installation, Book)
2012 Breiviks Statement, Weimar/Berlin (Lecture performance)
2011/12 Hate Radio, Bregenz/Kigali/Berlin (Theater, Film, Installation, Book, Radio Play)
2010/11 City of Change,  St. Gallen (Theater performance, Book, Film)
2010 Land of Hope, Berlin (Performance)
2009/10 The last days of the Ceausescus,  Bucharest/Berlin (Theater, Film, Book)
2017 Lenin, Berlin (Theater performance)
2019 Oreste in Mosul, Mosul (Theater performance)
2020 Familie, NTGent (Theater)
2022 Everywoman, Berlin (Theater)

References

 External links 
 IIPM (International Institute of Political Murder)
 Stage Presens. About the work of Milo Rau, in: Frieze, Issue 10, June–August 2013The New York Times'': "Is Milo Rau Really the Most Controversial Director in Theater?" Oct. 3, 2018.

Living people
1977 births
People from Bern
Swiss theatre directors
Swiss film directors
Swiss essayists